
Gmina Raków is a rural gmina (administrative district) in Kielce County, Świętokrzyskie Voivodeship, in south-central Poland.

The gmina contains part of the protected area called Cisów-Orłowiny Landscape Park.

Villages
Gmina Raków contains the villages and settlements of Bardo, Celiny, Chańcza, Dębno, Drogowle, Głuchów-Lasy, Jamno, Korzenno, Koziel, Lipiny, Mędrów, Nowa Huta, Ociesęki, Pągowiec, Papiernia, Pułaczów, Radostów, Raków, Rakówka, Rembów, Smyków, Stary Głuchów, Szumsko, Szumsko-Kolonie, Wola Wąkopna, Wólka Pokłonna, Zalesie and Życiny.

Neighbouring gminas
Gmina Raków is bordered by the gminas of Bogoria, Daleszyce, Iwaniska, Łagów, Pierzchnica, Staszów and Szydłów.

References
 Polish official population figures 2006

Rakow
Kielce County